Cheng Nan-jung (Taiwanese: Tēnn Lâm-iông; sometimes anglicised Nylon Deng; 12 September 1947 – 7 April 1989) was a Taiwanese publisher and pro-democracy activist. He was the founder of the Freedom Era Weekly. He is most known internationally for setting himself on fire in support of freedom of speech.

Background and career
Cheng's father was a mainlander from Fuzhou, Fujian, China and his mother was from Keelung, Taiwan. Cheng was born in the year of the February 28 Incident. On his first job-seeking résumé, Cheng Nan-jung wrote: "I was born the year of the February 28 Incident, and this incident has tormented me throughout my life.... Only because we were protected by our neighbors were we mainlanders safe from the wave of retaliation from the Taiwanese." He wrote that his experience growing up in the White Terror drove his commitment to Taiwan independence.

Cheng studied engineering at Taiwan Provincial Cheng Kung University, and philosophy at Fu Jen Catholic University and National Taiwan University. He refused to take the classes on Sun Yat-sen Thought (國父思想), and handed back his National Taiwan University graduation certificate.

In March 1984, he founded Freedom Era Weekly and declared that "[it was] fighting for 100 percent freedom of speech." Cheng Nan-jung had registered 18 different magazine licences, as "spare tires" for use when the Kuomintang banned the magazine and suspended publication. He said "I'm not scared of arrest nor of being killed, basically, I'll fight them to the very end." The magazine was banned several times by the authorities but continued to be printed and distributed.

Immolation and aftermath
In 1989, Cheng was charged with insurrection for printing a proposal for a constitution for the Republic of Taiwan.  An arrest warrant was issued.  He refused to appear in court. When the police attempted to break into his office in order to arrest him on April 7, he committed suicide by self-immolation. He set fire to his office and died in the blaze.  His immolation protest against the Kuomintang was covered by Formosa Television several years later.

At Cheng's funeral on May 19, another Taiwanese pro-democracy activist, Chan I-hua, also immolated himself when the funeral procession was blocked by police.

Cheng's widow, Yeh Chu-lan, held senior positions in the Democratic Progressive Party administration between 2000 and 2005. Former vice-Prime Minister, she was acting mayor of Kaohsiung from July 2005 to December 2006. In 2007 she was mentioned as a possible running mate for Frank Hsieh in the 2008 Taiwan Presidential Election, but in the end Hsieh picked Su Tseng-chang.

In 1999, a museum dedicated to Cheng called the Cheng Nan-jung Liberty Museum was opened in Taipei. The museum rests on the venue where Cheng immolated himself. On 22 December 2016, the Executive Yuan announced that 7 April every year would become Freedom of Expression Day to commemorate his death.

In November 2013, a vote was held to choose the name for a new square in National Cheng Kung University, his name won the vote, but the university chief secretary chose to ignore the vote outcome.

See also
List of political self-immolations

References

External links
twhistory.org.tw - An epic poem not yet finished: Twelve years after Cheng Nan-jung's self-immolation

1947 births
1989 suicides
Fu Jen Catholic University alumni
Magazine editors
National Cheng Kung University alumni
National Taiwan University alumni
Writers from Taipei
Suicides by self-immolation
Suicides in Taiwan
Taiwan independence activists
Taiwanese democracy activists
Taiwanese revolutionaries
Taiwanese journalists
20th-century journalists
Spouses of Taiwanese politicians